Stavros Schizas (Greek: Σταύρος Σχίζας); (born January 10, 1989 in Athens, Greece) is a Greek professional basketball player and the team captain for Aris of the Greek Basket League.

College career
Schizas played college basketball at Kirtland Community College and at Rochester College. As a sophomore, Schizas averaged 16,5 points and 8,5 rebounds per game.

Professional career
In 2014, Schizas began his professional career with the Greek League club Rethymno Aegean. He stayed to the club until 2016.

On July 4, 2016, Schizas joined Kymis. 
On July 1, 2017, after playing one year with Kymis, Schizas signed with Kolossos.
On July 14, 2018, Schizas moved to Thessaloniki for PAOK, signing a two-year contract.
 
On July 23, 2020, Schizas switched to Iraklis Thessaloniki. 

On July 25, 2021, Schizas signed with his third Greek Basket League club from Thessaloniki, Aris, where he was named team captain alongside Olivier Hanlan. He appeared in only 10 league games due to injuries, averaging 4 points and 1.4 rebounds in under 10 minutes per contest.

References

External links
Real GM Profile
Eurobasket.com Profile
Greek Basket League Profile 
Rochester College Profile
ESPN College Profile

1989 births
Living people
Greek Basket League players
Iraklis Thessaloniki B.C. players
Greek expatriate basketball people in the United States
Greek men's basketball players
Junior college men's basketball players in the United States
Kolossos Rodou B.C. players
Kymis B.C. players
P.A.O.K. BC players
Rethymno B.C. players
Rochester University alumni
Shooting guards
Small forwards
Basketball players from Athens